David McKean (born 29 December 1963) is an English illustrator, photographer, comic book artist, graphic designer, filmmaker and musician. His work incorporates drawing, painting, photography, collage, found objects, digital art, and sculpture. McKean's projects include: illustrating books by authors such as Neil Gaiman, Grant Morrison, Heston Blumenthal, Ray Bradbury and Stephen King, and directed three feature films.

Career

Comics 
McKean first showed his work to editors at Marvel Comics, DC Comics, and Continuity Comics when visiting New York City in 1986. McKean met writer Neil Gaiman and the pair collaborated on a short graphic novel of disturbing childhood memories, Violent Cases, published in 1987. This was followed in 1988 by a Black Orchid miniseries and Hellblazer covers for DC Comics.

In 1989, he illustrated the Batman graphic novel, Arkham Asylum: A Serious House on Serious Earth, with writer Grant Morrison. Comics historian Les Daniels observed that "Arkham Asylum was an unprecedented success, selling 182,166 copies in hardcover and another 85,047 in paperback...McKean produced 120 pages of paintings for Arkham Asylum, offering powerful visual reinterpretations of the classic characters." From 1989–1997 McKean produced the covers for Gaiman's celebrated series The Sandman, all its collected editions, and many of its spin-offs. In 1998, the cover images from The Sandman were released as one compiled volume titled Dustcovers: The Collected Sandman Covers. Further collaborations with Gaiman produced the graphic novels Signal to Noise in 1992 previously serialised in The Face magazine, about a dying filmmaker and his hypothetical last film; and The Tragical Comedy or Comical Tragedy of Mr. Punch, which explored similar themes as Violent Cases through the imagery of the Punch and Judy show. In 1995 McKean wrote and illustrated a book for The Rolling Stones called Voodoo Lounge to tie in with the release of their album of the same name.

Between 1990 and 1996, McKean wrote and drew the ten issues of Cages, an ambitious graphic novel about artists and creativity, illustrated in a stripped-down pen-and-ink style influenced by Alberto Breccia, José Antonio Muñoz and Lorenzo Mattotti. Cages was published as a single volume by Kitchen Sink Press in 1998, and in a new edition by NBM Publishing in 2002. In 2010, Cages was released by Dark Horse Comics in paperback. An anniversary edition was released in 2016 by the same publisher, featuring a new introduction by Terry Gilliam.

McKean's collections of short comics Pictures That Tick, and Pictures That Tick 2: Exhibition were published by Dark Horse Comics in 2009 and 2015. Pictures That Tick won the Victoria and Albert Museum Illustrated Book of the Year award.

McKean created a wordless erotic graphic novel called Celluloid for Delcourt, which was published in the United States by Fantagraphics Books.

Black Dog: The Dreams of Paul Nash, which was a commission by the 14-18 Now Foundation, The Imperial War Museum and The Lakes International Comic art Festival, was released as an artist's edition in June 2016, and was published in October 2016 by Dark Horse Comics as an oversized hardback and regular paperback. The project was also a live performance featuring cellist/singer Matthew Sharp and violinist Clare Haythornthwaite, and was performed in Amiens, Kendal, Toronto, Munich, Mumbai, London, Rye and Ashford.

Raptor was released in 2021 by Dark Horse Books   and is the first of a proposed series of books featuring the character Sokol.

Illustration 
McKean designed the posters for the Raindance Film Festival for five consecutive years between 1996–2000. In 1997 he wrote, directed and edited a ninety-second trailer for the festival. In 2005, McKean designed the poster for the 32nd Telluride Film Festival.  In 2006, he designed projections, sets and directed film clips for the Broadway musical Lestat, adapted from Anne Rice's novels, with music and lyrics by Elton John and Bernie Taupin.

McKean has created a few books documenting his travels using only illustrations. Examples include Postcards from Vienna, Postcards from Barcelona, Postcards from Paris (2008), Postcards from Brussels (2009), Postcards from Perugia (2011), Postcards from Bilbao (2012). He created another book of 200 pages called Squink (éditions BdArtist(e)) that gathered a number of drawings in 15 chapters.

Album and book covers
McKean created album covers for many artists, amongst others for Counting Crows, Alice Cooper, Testament, Altan, Tori Amos, Download, Fear Factory, Front Line Assembly, Paradise Lost, Dream Theater, Skinny Puppy, Toad the Wet Sprocket and Steve Walsh. 

Bill Bruford's Earthworks commissioned McKean artworks for six of their albums from 1994 to 2004, as well as additional images for the 2019 Complete box set.

He has also made book covers for Jonathan Carroll, Iain Sinclair and Alan Moore.

Books of photography 
He has published five books which include photography:

A Small Book of Black and White Lies (1995)
Option: Click (1998)
The Particle Tarot: The Major Arcana (2000)
The Particle Tarot: The Minor Arcana (2006)
Prompt: Conversations with Artificial Intelligence (2022)

Work with John Cale 
McKean designed and illustrated John Cale's autobiography What's Welsh for Zen, a further biography called Sedition and Alchemy, a box set of C.D.s called Circus Live, and used John's Welsh-by-way-of-New York voice as the narrator for his short film Neon.

Children's picture books 
McKean has collaborated with Neil Gaiman on four children's picture books, The Day I Swapped My Dad for Two Goldfish (1998), The Wolves in the Walls (2003), Crazy Hair (2009), and Mirrormask (2005), and illustrated Gaiman's children's novels Coraline (2002) and The Graveyard Book (2008), as well as S. F. Said's Varjak Paw (2003), Outlaw Varjak Paw (2006), Phoenix (2013) and Tyger (2022). The Wolves in the Walls: a Musical Pandemonium premiered as a play in Glasgow in 2006 with Improbable and the National Theatre of Scotland. The National Theatre of Scotland adapted The Day I Swapped My Dad for Two Goldfish into a promenade performance for young people in 2013. He illustrated David Almond's The Savage published in April 2008, Slog's Dad published in September 2010, and Mouse Bird Snake Wolf (2013). In 2011, McKean collaborated with Richard Dawkins on The Magic of Reality, an introduction to critical thinking and science for children. McKean also illustrated Ray Bradbury's The Homecoming (2006).

The Fat Duck Cookbook 
In 2008, McKean collaborated with Heston Blumenthal on The Fat Duck Cookbook, an autobiography, compilation of key recipes and insight into Blumenthal's scientific method. The book was nominated in the James Beard Foundation Awards for Cooking from a Professional Point of View and won the Photography/Illustration award. In 2014, McKean collaborated again with Blumenthal and writer Pascal Clariss on Historical Heston, a collection of historically inspired recipes. The book won two James Beard Foundation Awards. McKean is the Director of Story at The Fat Duck, and helped to relaunch the restaurant after its refurbishment in 2015. He has created package designs, maps, menu designs and murals for The Fat Duck, as well as Dinner by Heston Blumenthal in London and Melbourne.

Stamps 
McKean created six images for the Royal Mail's Mythical Creatures collection, which featured depictions of mythical creatures found in British folklore, including dragons, unicorns, giants, pixies, mermaids, and fairies. The collection was released in the UK on 16 June 2009. The Presentation Pack contains short descriptions of each subject by author Neil Gaiman.

Films 
MirrorMask, McKean's first feature film as director, premiered at the Sundance Film Festival in January 2005. The screenplay was written by Neil Gaiman, from a story by Gaiman and McKean. A children's fantasy which combines live action and digital animation, MirrorMask was produced by Jim Henson Studios and stars a British cast Stephanie Leonidas, Jason Barry, Rob Brydon, and Gina McKee. Before MirrorMask, McKean directed a number of television intros and music videos as well as several short films, such as The Week Before (1998) and N[eon] (2002), which are included in the compilation DVD of McKean's work Keanoshow from Allen Spiegel Fine Arts. McKean has directed The Gospel of Us, a film of the National Theatre Wales's Passion play in Port Talbot which stars Michael Sheen. The feature film Luna, written and directed by McKean and starring Stephanie Leonidas, Ben Daniels, Dervla Kirwan and Michael Maloney, debuted at the Toronto International Film Festival in September 2014.

McKean was a concept artist on the TV mini-series Neverwhere (1996), which was created and co-written by Neil Gaiman, and the feature films Harry Potter and the Prisoner of Azkaban (2004) and Harry Potter and the Goblet of Fire (2005).

Theatre and live performance 
McKean wrote and performed a song cycle called Nine Lives at the Sydney Opera House as part of the Graphic Festival. This was also performed at the British Library and at LICAF.

McKean wrote the text for Wildworks' Wolf's Child site-specific theatre work as part of the Norwich Theatre Festival in 2015.

An Ape's Progress  was a commission by the Manchester Literature/Jazz Festivals in 2015, and was created by poet Matthew Sweeney, composer/saxophone player Iain Ballamy, cellist Matthew Sharp, singer Emilia Martensson, accordionist Stian Carstensen, and pianist Kit Downes, with McKean providing film projections and keyboards. A book of the work accompanied the show.

Black Dog: The Dreams of Paul Nash  is a multi-media, music, song and performance work commissioned by 14-18 Now Foundation and LICAF. McKean performs as narrator and pianist, Matthew Sharp as a performer, singer and cellist, and Clare Haythornthwaite as violinist/performer. It premiered in Amiens, and has been performed in Kendal. In 2016 it was performed in Rye, Ashford and at Tate Modern.

Music and Jazz label 
McKean has produced album artwork for many bands, such as: Paradise Lost, Machine Head, Fear Factory, Counting Crows, Dream Theater, Michael Nyman, and countless more. He has a longstanding relationship with industrial band Front Line Assembly, creating many illustrations for dozens of their albums from 1994 to 2021. McKean also founded the record label Feral Records with saxophonist Iain Ballamy.

Awards 
McKean has won numerous awards and accolades. Over the years, he has been nominated five times for a World Fantasy Award in the category of "Artist", and he won the award in 1991. His graphic novel Cages won the Alph-Art, Pantera, and Harvey Awards for best Graphic Novel. He has been nominated six times and won three Spectrum Awards in the categories of "Advertising", "Book", and "Comic". His collection of short comics, Pictures That Tick won the V&A Museum Illustrated Book Awards Overall First Prize. In 2004, McKean won a BSFA Award in "Short Fiction" with Neil Gaiman for their work, The Wolves in the Walls.  His film MirrorMask was nominated for the William Shatner Golden Groundhog Award for Best Underground Movie, the other nominated films were Green Street Hooligans, Nine Lives, Up for Grabs and Opie Gets Laid. Luna won Best British Feature at the Raindance Festival Awards, and also the Raindance Award at the Möet British Independent Film Awards. In 2017 McKean was the inaugural recipient of the "Sergio Aragones International Award for Excellence in Comic Art", given as part of The Lakes International Comic Art Festival.

References

External links

Official site for children's books with Neil Gaiman (UK publisher) and (US publisher)

Dave McKean at Mike's Amazing World of Comics
Dave McKean at the Unofficial Handbook of Marvel Comics Creators
Black Dog: the Dreams of Paul Nash
 

1963 births
20th-century English artists
21st-century English artists
Album-cover and concert-poster artists
DC Comics people
English comics artists
English comics writers
English film directors
English graphic designers
English illustrators
English people of Scottish descent
Photographers from Berkshire
Living people
People from Maidenhead
World Fantasy Award-winning artists
Writers who illustrated their own writing